The 2012 NCAA Division I Field Hockey Championship was the thirty-second women's collegiate field hockey tournament organized by the National Collegiate Athletic Association, to determine the top college field hockey team from Division I in the United States. The Princeton Tigers won their first championship, defeating the North Carolina Tar Heels in the final. The championship was played at the L.R. Hill Sports Complex on the home field of the host Old Dominion Lady Monarchs in Norfolk, Virginia.

Bracket

References 

2012
Field Hockey
2012 in women's field hockey
2012 in sports in Virginia